KOPE (88.9 FM) was an American radio station licensed by the FCC to serve the community of Eldorado, Texas. The station license was assigned to The Center for Education Nonprofit Corp. KOPE aired a jazz format.

The station had held the KOPE callsign since September 21, 2009.

The FCC cancelled KOPE's license on March 14, 2023, due to the station having been silent since at least February 17, 2021.

References

External links
 Official Website 
 

OPE
Radio stations established in 2009
Radio stations disestablished in 2023
2009 establishments in Texas
2023 disestablishments in Texas
Defunct radio stations in the United States
Schleicher County, Texas
OPE